The Francis P. Farquhar Mountaineering Award is given by the Sierra Club, and is named after club leader, historian and mountaineer Francis P. Farquhar. According to the Sierra Club, this award "honors an individual's contribution to mountaineering and enhancement of the Club's prestige in this field". It was first given in 1970.

Award winners 

 1970 Norman Clyde and Allen Steck
 1971 Richard Leonard
 1972 Jules Eichorn
 1973 Glen Dawson
 1974 Nicholas Clinch and Marjorie Farquhar
 1977 Galen Rowell
 1978 John and Ruth Mendenhall
 1979 William E. Siri
 1981 Sam Fink
 1982 Arlene Blum
 1983 Steve Roper
 1985 Richard Hechtel
 1987 Lotte Kramer
 1988 Gordon Benner
 1994 Randy Danta and Doug Mantle
 2001 Andrew J. Smatko
 2003 Barbara Lilley
 2005 Gerry Roach
 2010 Greg Vernon
 2011 Royal Robbins
 2012 Tina Bowman
 2013 R. J. Secor

References 

Sierra Club
 
Mountaineering awards